Nils Nygren was an early twentieth-century Swedish-American soccer center forward who played one season in the American Soccer League. 

Nygren played for the amateur New York Viking in the New York State League and Woburn Independent.  In 1928, he turned professional with the Boston Soccer Club.  Despite finishing nineteenth on the league’s scoring list that season, he left professional soccer.

External links

References

American soccer players
American Soccer League (1921–1933) players
Boston Soccer Club players
Year of birth missing
Year of death missing
Association football forwards